Ephydatia fluviatilis is a species of Ephydatia.

This species is spread globally.

One study elucidated this species's habitat preference in a freshwater lake in Utah.

Synonym (basionym): Spongia fluviatilis Linnaeus, 1759.

References

Spongillidae